Cristóbal Rojas Sandoval (26 June 1502 – 22 September 1580) was a Roman Catholic prelate who served as Archbishop of Seville (1571–1580), 
Bishop of Córdoba (1562–1571),
Bishop of Badajoz (1556–1562),
and Bishop of Oviedo (1546–1556).

Biography
Cristóbal Rojas Sandoval was born in Fuenterrabía, Spain.
On 8 October 1546, he was appointed by the King of Spain and confirmed by Pope Paul III as Bishop of Oviedo. 
On 4 May 1556, he was appointed by Pope Paul IV as Bishop of Badajoz. 
On 27 May 1562, he was appointed by Pope Pius IV as Bishop of Córdoba. 
On 18 May 1571, he was appointed by Pope Pius V as Archbishop of Seville where he served until his death on 22 September 1580 in Cigalles, Spain.

Episcopal succession
While bishop, he was the principal consecrator of:
Manuel de Mercado Aldrete, Bishop of Puerto Rico (1571); 
Diego de Landa, Bishop of Yucatán (1573); 
Sebastián Ocando, Bishop of Santa Marta (1579); and 
Toribio Alfonso de Mogrovejo, Archbishop of Lima (1580).

References

External links and additional sources
 (for Chronology of Bishops) 
 (for Chronology of Bishops) 
 (for Chronology of Bishops) 
 (for Chronology of Bishops) 
 (for Chronology of Bishops) 
 (for Chronology of Bishops) 
 (for Chronology of Bishops) 
 (for Chronology of Bishops) 

1502 births
1580 deaths
16th-century Roman Catholic archbishops in Spain
Bishops appointed by Pope Paul III
Bishops appointed by Pope Paul IV
Bishops appointed by Pope Paul V